Allister Carter (born 25 July 1979) is an English professional snooker player. He has twice been the World Championship runner-up, in 2008 and 2012, losing both finals to Ronnie O'Sullivan. He has won five ranking titles and briefly reached number two in the world rankings in 2010. His nickname, "The Captain", comes from his hobby of piloting aeroplanes.

Career
Carter turned professional in 1996. He first emerged in 1999, winning the WPBSA Association Young Player of the Year award after winning the Benson and Hedges Championship in 1999 – this earned him a wild card place in the Masters. He also reached the semi-finals of the 1999 Grand Prix. It was eight years before he reached another ranking semi-final, the 2007 Malta Cup.

He was close to the elite top 16 for three successive seasons ranking as 17, 19, and 19 through 2003–04, 2004–05 and 2005–06, respectively, before reaching it in the 2006–07 season and remaining there in 2008.

He reached the last 16 (second round) of the World Championship in 2005, after scoring the first 10–0 victory in the event since 1993 against 1993 semi-finalist James Wattana in qualifying. At the 2007 World Championship he beat Andy Hicks in the first round, 10–4, before beating World No. 1 and seven-time champion Stephen Hendry 13–6 to reach his first World Championship quarter-final and guarantee a place in the Top-16. Carter now has a 5–4 record against Hendry; conversely, he has only beaten Ronnie O'Sullivan in the 2nd round of the 2018 World Snooker Championship 13–9, having lost 16 of the last 17 encounters.

Carter has at times missed out on opportunities from winning positions, an extreme example being in the first round of the 2007 UK Championship, when Carter led Barry Hawkins 8–3 before Hawkins won the next six frames to win 9–8. However, Carter got his own back on Hawkins during the 2008 World Championship by beating him 10–9 in a 'controversial' finale. Hawkins had levelled the match to 9–9, when the players were pulled out of the arena to allow the evening matches to begin. They returned after one of the evening's two matches had been completed – on a table they had not previously played on. Hawkins felt this break interrupted his momentum, handing the match to Carter. He followed this by defeating two former champions in succession; provisional World Number 1 Shaun Murphy 13–4 in the second round and then 2002 winner Peter Ebdon 13–9 in the quarter-final. In the semi-final on 4 May 2008 he beat Joe Perry 17–15 to book a place against Ronnie O'Sullivan in the final. Carter lost the final 8–18.

Carter scored his first 147 break on 29 April at the 2008 World Championship, one day after Ronnie O'Sullivan had made one in the same tournament. This made Carter the sixth man to achieve this feat at the Crucible (the eighth made there, as O'Sullivan had previously achieved it three times), and the first to have done so without previously winning a tournament. It is the first time two 147s have been made in the same event.

Carter soon showed signs of carrying this form forward in subsequent events. He won his second non-ranking tournament, the Huangshan Cup in China, with a 5–3 win over the reigning Grand Prix champion Marco Fu. In the 2008/09 season Carter reached the semi-final stage on three occasions. He progressed to the semi-finals of the 2008–09 season's first ranking event, the 2008 Northern Ireland Trophy before losing 5–6 to O'Sullivan having led 5–4. He reached the same stage of the Grand Prix, defeating veterans Steve Davis and John Parrott before losing to Ryan Day, again 5–6 The third occasion was the UK Championship where wins over Peter Ebdon and Mark Williams were followed by a close 9–7 defeat to the man he was victorious against in the Huangshan Cup final in China, Marco Fu. After thirteen years as a professional, Carter defeated the likes of Jimmy White, Graeme Dott, Shaun Murphy, Anthony Hamilton, and Joe Swail to finally win his first ranking tournament – the 2009 Welsh Open.

Carter made a slow start to the 2009–10 season, losing 0–5 to Liang Wenbo in the last 16 of the Shanghai Masters and losing in the first round at the Grand Prix, before reaching the quarter-finals of the UK Championship. As the defending champion at the Welsh Open he progressed to the final but was beaten by John Higgins, the reigning world champion at the time. He finished the season strongly by reaching the semi-finals at the China Open and the World Championship, losing in the latter to eventual champion, Neil Robertson, by 12–17. Of the six ranking tournaments that were staged during the 2009/2010 season, Carter's campaigns were ended by the eventual champion on four occasions, and on another by the runner-up.  Carter finished the season by moving up to a career high position of 4th in the world rankings.

Carter won the 2010 Shanghai Masters. Carter had to recover from 1–4 down in the quarter-final to defeat Matthew Stevens 5–4, Stevens missing the final black off its spot in the deciding frame. He then won six frames in a row from 0–2 down to beat Mark Selby 6–2, and edged past qualifier Jamie Burnett 10–7 in the final. The following events were not very successful for Ali Carter, as he was eliminated in the last 32 of the World Open by Mark Williams 1–3, he suffered an early exit against the young talent Mark Joyce in the first round of the UK Championship by 6–9 and also lost his first round match of the 2011 Masters against Peter Ebdon by 5–6.

2011/2012 season 
Carter's 2011–12 season got off to a poor start as he exited the first two ranking events of the year, the Australian Goldfields Open and the Shanghai Masters, in the first round. At the UK Championships he defeated Robert Milkins, but then lost 2–6 to Mark Allen in the last 16. After the match Carter stated on Twitter: "I'm going to retire at the end of the season! And I can't wait!" and that he was "dead serious" about the threat. Later on he admitted the comments were made "in the heat of the moment" but that he did have some "serious thinking to do at the end of the season". He lost in the first round in the Masters and the next two ranking events, and then withdrew from the World Open in China for medical reasons. Although he reached the quarter-finals of the China Open with wins over Dominic Dale and Lu Ning before losing 2–5 to Ding Junhui, Carter found himself out of the world's top 16 for the first time since 2005.

Before the start of the World Championship Carter stated that his future in the game depended on his health, as his ten-year battle with Crohn's disease continued. Three weeks before the start of the event he began cutting out dairy and wheat from his diet. This looked to have an effect on the snooker table too as he raced into an 8–1 lead over Mark Davis in the opening session of the first round, before returning to close out the match 10–2. He played world number 2 Judd Trump in the second round and from 9–12 behind, produced a superb fightback to record the result of his season to take the match 13–12 and reach the quarter-finals. He defeated impressive debutant Jamie Jones 13–11 in the last eight to book a semi-final with Stephen Maguire. He won this match by a 17–12 scoreline to play in a repeat of the 2008 final against Ronnie O'Sullivan. He lost 11–18, meaning he has now not beaten O'Sullivan in any of their 12 ranking event matches. Despite reaching the final, Carter finished the season ranked world number 17, meaning he had dropped 11 places during the year.

2012/2013 season 
Carter began the season in less than auspicious form as he lost in the first round of both the Wuxi Classic and Australian Goldfields Open. He won his first match in a ranking event of the season by beating Robert Milkins 5–4 in the Shanghai Masters and then whitewashed Stephen Maguire 5–0 to advance to the quarter-finals. He played John Higgins and at 1–4 down threatened a comeback by winning two frames, but lost the next to exit the tournament, losing 3–5. A first round defeat in the International Championship followed before he saw off Steve Davis and Mark Joyce in the UK Championship both by 6–2 scorelines and Stuart Bingham 6–4 to make the semi-finals for the first time since 2008. Carter was the victim of a stunning fightback against Shaun Murphy in the semi-finals as he led 8–4 but Murphy levelled at 8–8 and when Carter broke down on a break of 32 in the deciding frame, Murphy stepped in to win 9–8. Carter was beaten 3–6 by Higgins in the first round of the Masters.

Carter scored comfortable victories over Fraser Patrick, Anthony Hamilton and Michael Holt at the German Masters and then took advantage of a poor performance from Neil Robertson to reach the final, where he played Marco Fu. Carter came back from 3–5 down to win 9–6 to secure the third ranking event title of his career. Fu gained revenge in the PTC Finals by beating Carter 4–1 in the second round, before Carter reached the final of the non-televised Championship League but lost 2–3 to Martin Gould. He was edged out 4–5 in the second round of the China Open by Mark Williams. At the World Championship Carter won seven frames in a row to see off Ben Woollaston 10–4 in the first round, and came back from 1–5 in the last 16 against Ronnie O'Sullivan to level at 7–7, before O'Sullivan stepped up a gear to knock out Carter 13–8. He ended the season ranked world number 16.

2013/2014 season 
Carter won through to the third round of the Wuxi Classic, before being edged out 5–4 by David Morris in the last 16. After his first round loss to Mark Davis in the Shanghai Masters, Carter was forced to withdraw from the next two ranking events due to health problems documented below. He returned for the UK Championship and dropped just one frame in his opening two matches, before losing 3–6 to Graeme Dott. Carter dropped out of the top 16 in the world rankings during the year to miss out on playing in the Masters for the first time since 2006, but reached his first semi-final in a ranking event in over a year at the China Open, losing 2–6 to Neil Robertson. Carter was beaten 13–9 by Mark Selby in the second round of the World Championship and bemoaned his opponent's negative playing style, saying that he was the only one trying to make things happen during the game.

2014/2015 season 
Carter missed the start of the 2014–15 season due to receiving treatment for a recurrence of testicular cancer metastasising to his lung. He returned in October at the non-ranking General Cup and won the title by defeating Shaun Murphy 7–6 in the final. In October, World Snooker and the WPBSA announced that Carter's seeding for the remainder of the 2014–15 season would be based on a world ranking of 13. His first match back in a ranking event was a 5–6 loss to Zhang Anda in the opening round of the UK Championship. Carter received a standing ovation at the Masters and beat Barry Hawkins 6–1, before Neil Robertson defeated him by a reversal of this scoreline in the quarter-finals. Afterwards Carter said he was nowhere near match sharp and was targeting the World Championship as the place to rediscover his best form. He won his first matches at the venue stage of a ranking event this year at the Welsh Open with victories over Fraser Patrick, Mark King and Matthew Selt, before losing 2–4 to Ben Woollaston in the last 16 and was knocked out in the first round of the China Open 5–4 by Kurt Maflin.

Carter had a comprehensive 10–5 win over Alan McManus in the first round of the World Championship which began with a 127 break, before once again losing to Robertson in the next round, this time 5–13. Carter's ranking was now no longer frozen and with him dropping down to world number 29 he set a goal to reclaim his top 16 ranking next season.

2015/2016 season 

Carter won the Paul Hunter Classic by defeating Shaun Murphy 4–3 in the final with a 95 break in the deciding frame, after a spirited fightback from Murphy to level it from 1–3 down. It was Carter's maiden European Tour title and his first ranking title since beating cancer. The win was especially fitting as the player it was named after, Paul Hunter, died of cancer in 2006. Carter lost 2–6 in the third round of the UK Championship to John Higgins. At the World Grand Prix he beat Luca Brecel 4–1 and Tom Ford 4–0 to reach his first ranking event quarter-final of the season, but lost 1–4 to Joe Perry. Another followed at the PTC Finals courtesy of knocking out Graeme Dott and Judd Trump both 4–1. In the quarters Ricky Walden eliminated him 4–1. Carter came through a trio of matches to qualify for the World Championship and held his nerve after leading defending champion Stuart Bingham 5–1 and 8–5 to beat him 10–9. Carter took a 9–7 advantage over Alan McManus after the second session of their second round match, but went on to lose 11–13.

2016/2017 season 
Carter whitewashed John Higgins 5–0 in the quarter-finals of the World Open and swept past Thepchaiya Un-Nooh 6–1 to play Joe Perry in the final. Carter completed a 10–8 win to take his fourth ranking title and first since 2013, as well as regaining his place in the elite top 16. At the Shanghai Masters he lost 1–5 in the quarter-finals to Stuart Bingham. Carter reached the final of the German Masters by seeing off Martin Gould 6–2 and led Anthony Hamilton 5–2. However, he then lost seven of the next eight frames to be defeated 6–9. Carter beat Shaun Murphy 5–4 and Neil Robertson 5–3 at the Players Championship and then was defeated 4–6 by Judd Trump in the semi-finals. He lost 7–10 to Graeme Dott in the first round of the World Championship.

2017/2018 season 
Carter was a consistent performer in the 2017/18 season. He began the season by reaching the semi final of the China Championship, losing 6–4 to Shaun Murphy. He also reached the quarter final of the International Championship after beating Jamie Barrett, Andrew Higginson, Stephen Maguire, and Shaun Murphy. In the quarter final, Carter forced a decider after trailing 5–3 to Martin Gould, but eventually lost 6–5. At the World Snooker Championship, Ali Carter advanced to the quarter final after beating Graeme Dott and Ronnie O'Sullivan. He eventually lost 13–8 to Mark Williams.

2018/2019 season 
In October, Carter reached the quarter final of the English Open after wins over Rory McLeod, Luca Brecel, Matthew Selt, and Daniel Wells, before losing 5–2 to Stuart Bingham. He then reached another quarter final of a ranking event, this time at the International Championship, but was whitewashed by Mark Allen 6–0. The best result of the season for Carter came in the World Grand Prix in February. He defeated Martin O'Donnell, Mark Allen, David Gilbert, and Xiao Guodong to reach the final, but eventually lost 10–6 to Judd Trump.

2019/2020 season 
Carter took part in the 2020 Dafabet Masters, despite being ranked 17th, as a result of Ronnie O'Sullivan not wishing to compete. He reached the final for the first time in his career, his opponent was Stuart Bingham. Carter trailed 3–5 at the end of the first session, but then won the first four frames in the second session to take a lead of 7–5. Bingham responded well though and took the next four frames to be one frame away from victory, who eventually won 10–8. Immediately after the Masters, Carter also reached the semi-final of the European Masters, but lost 6–1 to Neil Robertson.

Personal life
In 2003, Carter was diagnosed with Crohn's disease. He has partly controlled this by limiting dairy and wheat/gluten in his diet.

On 1 July 2013, it was announced that Carter had been diagnosed with testicular cancer. He had surgery a day later and was advised to rest for a month. On 19 July 2013, he announced on his Twitter page that he had received the all-clear and would resume his career at the Shanghai Masters in September. He stated in April 2014 that he would have chosen to take six months to a year away from snooker, but this had not been possible due to his need to regain his place in the top 16 of the world rankings. A month later, World Snooker announced that Carter had been diagnosed with cancer in his lung and would be taking a break from the sport to receive a course of intensive chemotherapy. In August 2014, he successfully completed treatment for this secondary tumour (metastatic recurrence of the testicular cancer), including surgery, and returned to the World Snooker Tour in October at the General Cup, which he won.

Carter practised at Chelmsford's Rivermead Snooker Club before buying the club and becoming the new owner. He also has a keen interest in flying and has a pilot's licence.

His first child, with his ex-partner Sarah, a son named Max, was born in 2009. He also has a child named Olivia with his ex-partner, Stella English, who was the winner of Series Six of The Apprentice in 2010.

Performance and rankings timeline

Career finals

Ranking finals: 12 (5 titles)
{| width=100%
| valign=top width=40% align=left |

Minor-ranking finals: 1 (1 title)

Non-ranking finals: 9 (3 titles)

See also
 List of people diagnosed with Crohn's disease

References

External links 

Ali Carter at worldsnooker.com

Profile on Global Snooker

1979 births
Living people
English snooker players
Sportspeople from Colchester
Sportspeople from Chelmsford
World Games silver medalists
Competitors at the 2017 World Games
People with Crohn's disease